Elverum may refer to:

Places
Elverum, a municipality in Innlandet county, Norway.
Elverum (town), a town within Elverum Municipality in Innlandet county, Norway.
Elverum Stadion, a stadium in the town of Elverum in Innlandet county, Norway.
Elverum Hospital, a hospital in the town of Elverum in Innlandet county, Norway.
Elverum Station, a railway station in the town of Elverum in Innlandet county, Norway.
Elverum Church, a church in the town of Elverum in Innlandet county, Norway.

People
Phil Elverum, an American musician, songwriter, record producer and visual artist.
Geneviève Castrée (née Elverum), a Canadian cartoonist, illustrator, and musician.
Elverum (surname), a list of people with the surname Elverum.

Sports
Elverum Håndball, a handball team from Elverum Municipality in Innlandet county, Norway.
Elverum Fotball, an association football team from Elverum Municipality in Innlandet county, Norway.
Elverum IL, a sports club based in Elverum Municipality in Innlandet county, Norway.

Other
Elverum Authorization, a law in World War II era Norway to give the Cabinet absolute authority during the Nazi invasion.